Vladislav Yevgenievich Namestnikov (born 22 November 1992) is a Russian professional ice hockey centre for the Winnipeg Jets of the National Hockey League (NHL). He was selected 27th overall by the Lightning in the 2011 NHL Entry Draft, and has previously played in the NHL with the Tampa Bay Lightning, New York Rangers, Ottawa Senators, Colorado Avalanche, Detroit Red Wings and Dallas Stars.

Playing career

Junior
Namestnikov was selected 20th overall by the London Knights in the 2010 Ontario Hockey League (OHL) entry draft. He was also selected 11th overall in the Kontinental Hockey League (KHL) draft by Torpedo Nizhny Novgorod, but he ultimately chose London after deciding he did not want to play in Russia. Namestnikov scored 68 points in 68 games with the Knights in 2010–11 and was rated one of the top players available in the 2011 NHL Entry Draft, eventually being selected in the first round by the Tampa Bay Lightning.

On 13 March 2012, the Lightning announced that they had signed Namestnikov to a three-year, entry-level contract. He played in 60 games with the London Knights that season, scoring 22 goals and 70 points. He also appeared in six OHL playoff games in 2011, recording one goal and five points.

Professional

Tampa Bay Lightning
On 14 September 2012, the Lightning assigned Namestnikov and 17 other players to the Syracuse Crunch, their American Hockey League (AHL) affiliate, during the 2012–13 NHL lockout. He finished the season playing in the Calder Cup Final, where the Crunch fell to the Grand Rapids Griffins in a 4–2 series defeat.

On 7 February 2014, Tampa Bay recalled Namestnikov from the Crunch, where at the time he was leading the team in assists and points. Namestnikov made his NHL debut on 8 February 2014, skating 11:55 for the Lightning in their 4–2 win over the Detroit Red Wings. On 5 March 2014, Namestnikov was reassigned to the Crunch after failing to register a point in four NHL games. He regained his scoring touch in Syracuse and on 6 January 2015, he represented the Eastern Conference in the AHL All-Star Game. Vladimir score 301 goals and 402 assists 703 points

Namestnikov made Tampa Bay's roster out of training camp to start the 2014–15 season. On 13 October 2014, he picked up his first career NHL point with an assist on a Victor Hedman goal, and soon after scored his first career NHL goal in a 7–1 Tampa victory over the Montreal Canadiens. He scored his first career game-winning goal on 24 October in a game against the Winnipeg Jets. Though he had begun demonstrating that he could contribute offensively at the NHL level, the Lightning reassigned Namestnikov to Syracuse on 3 December 2014. He was recalled to Tampa on 4 March 2015, and the team selected him to their playoff roster.

On 17 July 2015, the Lightning announced the re-signing of Namestnikov to a one-year, two-way contract. He subsequently played in 43 games with the Lightning during the 2014–15 NHL season and posted nine goals and 16 points (9–7–16), all career highs. Namestnikov appeared in 12 Stanley Cup playoff games in 2015, recording one assist. In addition, he played in 34 games with the Syracuse Crunch during the 2014–15 season, registering 14 goals and 35 points.

On 15 January 2016, Namestnikov recorded his first career NHL hat-trick in a 5–4 overtime win over the visiting Pittsburgh Penguins. On 3 May 2016, Namestnikov recorded his first NHL playoff goal, which came in a 5–4 overtime Lightning win over the New York Islanders.

Namestnikov re-signed with the Lightning during the summer of 2016, agreeing to a two-year, $3.875 million deal.

New York Rangers
On 26 February 2018, the day of the 2017–18 NHL trade deadline, the Lightning sent Namestnikov to the New York Rangers, along with Brett Howden, Libor Hájek and a 2018 and 2019 draft pick, in exchange for Ryan McDonagh and J. T. Miller. The Rangers re-signed Namestnikov to a two-year extension on 1 July 2018.

Ottawa Senators
Namestnikov began the 2019–20 season with two scoreless games for the Rangers before he was traded to the Ottawa Senators in exchange for Nick Ebert and a fourth-round pick in the 2021 NHL Entry Draft on 7 October 2019. In his debut with the Senators, he registered an assist in a 6–4 loss to the St. Louis Blues on 11 October 2019. In his second game, Namestnikov collected his first two goals plus an assist against his former club, the Tampa Bay Lightning, helping the Senators claim their first victory of the season in a 4–2 decision on 12 October 2019. In an increased offensive role, Namestnikov collected 13 goals and 25 points in 54 games for the Senators.

Colorado Avalanche
With the rebuilding Senators falling out of playoff contention, Namestnikov was traded for the second time within the season, dealt to the Colorado Avalanche at the trade deadline in exchange for a 2021 fourth-round draft selection on 24 February 2020.

Detroit Red Wings
On 11 October 2020, Namestnikov signed a two-year, $4 million dollar contract with the Detroit Red Wings.

Dallas Stars
On 21 March 2022, Namestnikov was traded by Detroit to the Dallas Stars in exchange for a 2024 fourth-round draft pick.

Return to Tampa Bay
On 13 July 2022, Namestnikov signed as a free agent to a one-year, $2.5 million contract to return to his original draft club, the Tampa Bay Lightning.

Winnipeg Jets
On 1 March 2023, he was traded to the San Jose Sharks in exchange for Mikey Eyssimont. However, the Sharks traded him to the Winnipeg Jets two days later in exchange for a fourth-round pick in the 2025 NHL Entry Draft.

International play

On 2 March 2016, the Russian Ice Hockey Federation named Namestnikov to its roster for the 2016 World Cup of Hockey. Namestnikov was joined by Lightning teammates Nikita Kucherov, Nikita Nesterov and Andrei Vasilevskiy. The tournament took place from 17 September to 1 October 2016 in Toronto. On 21 May 2017, Namestnikov helped Russia capture a bronze medal when they defeated Finland in the bronze medal game of the 2017 IIHF World Championship.

Personal life
Although born in Voskresensk, Namestnikov moved to the United States when he was eight months old, settling in Michigan, with his family. When he was eight, he returned to Voskresensk in Russia to hone his hockey skills, eventually playing in the Vysshaya Liga with Khimik Voskresensk at age 16.

Namestnikov's father, Evgeny, was a player for the Vancouver Canucks and also played for Torpedo Nizhny Novgorod. Like Vladislav, he also played for the Syracuse Crunch during his playing career. His uncle on his mother's side is Vyacheslav Kozlov, a former NHL star having played in over 1,000 games in the NHL for the Detroit Red Wings, Buffalo Sabres and Atlanta Thrashers. Another uncle, Ivan Novoseltsev, was also a professional hockey player, having played over five seasons in the NHL.

Namestnikov's brother, Max, currently plays for the Guelph Storm of the Ontario Hockey League, and is eligible for the 2022 NHL Entry Draft.

Career statistics

Regular season and playoffs

International

References

External links
 

1992 births
Living people
Colorado Avalanche players
Dallas Stars players
Detroit Red Wings players
London Knights players
National Hockey League first-round draft picks
New York Rangers players
Ottawa Senators players
People from Voskresensk
Russian expatriate ice hockey people
Russian expatriate sportspeople in the United States
Russian ice hockey centres
Sportspeople from Moscow Oblast
Syracuse Crunch players
Tampa Bay Lightning draft picks
Tampa Bay Lightning players
Winnipeg Jets players